Artstein's theorem states that a nonlinear dynamical system in the control-affine form

has a differentiable control-Lyapunov function if and only if it admits a regular stabilizing feedback u(x), that is a locally Lipschitz function on Rn\{0}.

The original 1983 proof by Zvi Artstein proceeds by a nonconstructive argument. In 1989 Eduardo D. Sontag provided a constructive version of this theorem explicitly exhibiting the feedback.

See also
Analysis and control of nonlinear systems
Control-Lyapunov function

References

Control theory
Theorems in dynamical systems